John Ellison (born 11 August 1941) is an American/Canadian musician, best known for writing the song "Some Kind of Wonderful." He was born in Montgomery, West Virginia, and was raised in Landgraff, West Virginia, a small, poverty-stricken coal mining village near Welch, West Virginia, and is a dual citizen of the United States and Canada, receiving his Canadian citizenship in 2006.

Biography
In the mid-1960s, Ellison traveled to Rochester, New York, where he met the original members of the Soul Brothers Five, becoming the sixth member and prompting the band to change its name to the Soul Brothers Six. The other members of the group included Charles Armstrong, Harry Armstrong, Vonnell Benjamin, Lester Pelemon, and Joe Johnson. The group signed a recording contract with Atlantic Records.

Ellison was the lead guitarist, singer, and songwriter for the group; and while traveling to a recording session in Philadelphia in 1967, Ellison wrote "She's Some Kind of Wonderful."  This original version reached number 91 on the US Billboard chart.  In 1987, the book Sweet Soul Music named the Soul Brothers Six as a major influence on the sound of modern music. Not only has the trademark bass line in "She's Some Kind of Wonderful" been utilized by countless other artists for a variety of different songs, but the song has also earned the Soul Brothers Six a spot in music history. More than 50 different artists have recorded "She's Some Kind of Wonderful," making it one of the most recorded songs in the history of music. In 1995, Ellison received a citation of achievement from Broadcast Music for writing the third-most played song in the world.

After the Soul Brothers Six broke up in the 1970s, Ellison continued to record and perform. In 1993 he released his first solo album, Welcome Back, followed by Missing You in 2000. In 2007, he released his third solo album, Back. He is a regular performer at the Nice Jazz Festival in France, and also performs regularly throughout Europe, Asia and North America.

In November 2008, Ellison was nominated for Male Vocalist of the Year, and for R&B/Soul Recording of the Year, for Back at the Hamilton Music Awards in Hamilton, Ontario. He also performed at the awards ceremony. On 6 December 2009, he was honored with the Arcelor Mittal Dofasco Lifetime Achievement Award and performed at the Hamilton Music Awards.

Ellison released his autobiography, Some Kind of Wonderful: The John Ellison Story, in July 2012. This work explores the racism and violence Ellison encountered and examines the relationship between these experiences and his songwriting.

In July 2013, a site near his childhood home in Landgraff, West Virginia, was cleared by Boy Scouts and other volunteers, as part of a service project connected to the 2013 National Boy Scout Jamboree. Plans are pending to build a replica of his boyhood home to house a museum dedicated to Ellison's music and his early life in the local mine camp community of Landgraff.

In October 2015, John was formally inducted into the West Virginia Music Hall of Fame.

References

People from McDowell County, West Virginia
1941 births
Living people
American rhythm and blues singers
Canadian rhythm and blues singers
African-American songwriters
Songwriters from West Virginia
Singers from West Virginia
Canadian soul singers
People from Montgomery, West Virginia
21st-century African-American people
20th-century African-American people